The Isla Magdalena national park (Spanish:  Parque Nacional Isla Magdalena ) is a  protected area in Magdalena Island, Patagonia, Chile. It was created in 1967 as Forest Reserve and was reclassified as a National Park in 1983.

Puerto Gaviota in the south of the national park is considered particularly noteworthy. In addition to larger Atilio island in the north, there are a number of smaller islands in the national park.

The national park is characterized by a variety of sea-birds (including penguins and cormorants) and vegetation typical of the moderate-cold zone.

The park can best reached by sea from the ports Puerto Cisnes or Puerto Puyuhuapi. On the island, no infrastructure exists.

References
Translation from the German Wikipedia site.

Protected areas of Aysén Region
National parks of Chile
Protected areas established in 1967